Rothley railway station is a heritage railway station on the preserved section of the Great Central Railway's  London Extension. Built to the standard island platform pattern of country stations on the line, it originally opened on 15 March 1899 and has been restored to late Edwardian era condition, circa 1910.

Route description 
Climbing south from milepost 97, the formation of the Mountsorrel quarry branch joins the line from the east, crossing over the quadruple spanned bridge 352 to reach Swithland Sidings. Here, the up and down lines have parted as this site was originally to be the location of a projected Swithland station. The entrance archway from the road below can still be seen from passing trains, even though a platform was never built. Swithland has been redeveloped from a single track back into a four-track main line with a number of exchange sidings. Resignalling of the area using Great Western equipment to represent the Great Western and Great Central Joint Railway is ongoing.

Shortly south of Swithland the summit is reached, and the line drops sharply again at a gradient of 1 in 176 into Rothley station. The station consists of a single island platform on which the station buildings sit, with original access from the road passing above. Beneath the stairway from the road is a museum, and beyond the booking hall there is a tea room. Rothley has been restored to its late Edwardian condition to represent the line during Great Central days. It is lit entirely by gas and never had mains electricity before closure by British Rail. The station's goods yard now forms the car park, at one end of which is a miniature railway, family picnic area, and historic stores room. At the other is a modern carriage repair works.

Overseeing railway traffic movements in the area is Rothley Cabin, a signal box recovered from Blind Lane Junction in Wembley and erected facing the station on the west side of the line. This signal box controls entry and exit to the southern end of the Great Central Railway's unique double track.  In 2009 it was joined by an ex-GCR lamp hut taken from Whetstone railway station.

After falling to the bridge over Rothley Brook (structure 355), the line begins climbing again towards the summit at Birstall.

The station is grade II listed.

Current services 
Heritage steam and diesel train services operate to Rothley from Loughborough Central every weekend and bank holiday of the year.
Additional services operate on selected weekdays throughout the year.

History

Rothley GCR 
Rothley station was built as a part of the Great Central Railway's London Extension and opened to passengers on 15 March 1899. The station was built to the standard London Extension country station pattern of a single large 'island' platform between the two running lines, on which stood the station buildings, including ticket office and waiting rooms. Access is made by descending a flight of stairs from a road bridge (structure number 354) that crosses the line.

Rothley station was built partly in a cutting at the north end (across which the bridge 354 crosses) and on an embankment at the south end. A modest goods yard with a goods shed, weighbridge and coal store were provided on the east side of the station, with train and shunting movements controlled from a signal box a little to the south of station on the west side of the main running lines. A stationmaster's house at the north eastern corner of the site watches over the station from on top of the banks.

The station closed on 4 March 1963 although trains continued to pass through until the line closed in 1969.

References 
Main Line is the quarterly news magazine of the preserved Great Central Railway.
Rothley Station website - Under Development at https://web.archive.org/web/20180811113848/http://rothleygcr.co.uk/

External links 
Gallery of photos around Rothley station

Former Great Central Railway stations
Heritage railway stations in Leicestershire
Grade II listed buildings in Leicestershire
Grade II listed railway stations
Great Central Railway (preserved)
Railway stations in Great Britain opened in 1899
Railway stations in Great Britain closed in 1963